Consort Zhuang (died 9 March 1811), from the Manchu Wanyan clan, was a consort of the Jiaqing Emperor.

Life

Family background
Consort Zhuang came from an ancient Manchu Wanyan clan. Her personal name was not recorded. Her father, Yilibu, was a provincial examination graduate.

Qianlong era
It is not known when Lady Wanggiya married Prince Jia of the First Rank as his concubine.

Jiaqing era
In December 1796, Lady Wanggiya was given a title "First Class Female Attendant Chun" ("chun" meaning literally "spring") comparing her beauty to the eternal youth symbolized by spring. She was promoted to "Noble Lady Chun" in 1798. In 1801, Noble Lady Chun was promoted to "Concubine Ji" ("ji" meaning "auspicious"). In 1808, Concubine Ji was promoted to "Consort Zhuang" ("zhuang" meaning "dignified"). Consort Zhuang died on 9 March 1811 in the Western Garden in Yuanmingyuan. She remained childless until her death. Her coffin was temporarily placed in the Antian Memorial Palace. Consort Zhuang was interred in the Chang Mausoleum in the Western Qing Tombs. Empress Xiaoherui personally took part in her funeral ceremony. It was uncommon for the empress to visit a concubine's grave during the Qing dynasty.

Titles
 During the reign of the Qianlong Emperor (r. 1735–1796):
 Lady Wanggiya (from unknown date) 
 Mistress (from unknown date)
 During the reign of the Jiaqing Emperor (r. 1796–1820):
 First Class Female Attendant Chun (from 1796), seventh rank consort
 Noble Lady Chun (from 1798), sixth rank consort 
 Concubine Ji (from 1801), fifth rank consort 
 Consort Zhuang (from 1808), fourth rank consort

See also
 Ranks of imperial consorts in China#Qing
 Royal and noble ranks of the Qing dynasty

References

Chinese imperial consorts
Consorts of the Jiaqing Emperor
1811 deaths